The 1960–61 LFF Lyga was the 40th season of the LFF Lyga football competition in Lithuania.  It was contested by 24 teams, and Elnias Šiauliai won the championship.

Group I

Group II

Final

References
RSSSF

LFF Lyga seasons
1961 in Lithuania
1960 in Lithuania
LFF
LFF